Roger King may refer to:

Roger King (politician) (born 1943), English political figure; Member of Parliament from 1983 to 1992
Roger King (producer) (1944–2007), American television production executive
Roger King (novelist) (born 1947), English novelist and filmmaker
Roger King, English keyboard player with Steve Hackett's band

See also
King (surname)
King Roger, opera